Mientras Buenos Aires duerme is a 1924 silent Argentine film directed and written by José A. Ferreyra. The film premiered in 1924 in Buenos Aires.

Cast
 Anselmo Aieta
 Mary Clay
 Julio Donadille
 Augusto Gocalbes
 Jorge Lafuente
 Percival Murray

External links
 

1924 films
1920s Spanish-language films
Argentine black-and-white films
Argentine silent films
Films directed by José A. Ferreyra
Films shot in Buenos Aires
Films set in Buenos Aires